This is a list of Jordanian actors.

List

Male actors

 Mondher Rayahneh (born 8 April 1979 in Irbid) 
 Yasser Al-Masri (22 November 1970 – 23 August 2018) 
 Nadim Sawalha (born 9 September 1935) 
 Nabil Sawalha

Female actors 
 Juliet Awwad (born July 7, 1951 in Amman, Jordan)
 Margo Haddad (born February 26, 1988)
 Mais Hamdan (born October 31, 1982)
 Abeer Issa (born 25 April 1961)
 Saba Mubarak (born April 10, 1976 in Anjara)

See also

 Cinema of Jordan

References

Jordanian actors
Actors
Jordan